The Uruguayan Air Force Flight 571 was the chartered flight of a Fairchild FH-227D from Montevideo, Uruguay to Santiago, Chile, that crashed in the Andes mountains on October 13, 1972. The accident and subsequent survival became known as the Andes flight disaster and the Miracle of the Andes.

The inexperienced co-pilot, Lieutenant-Colonel Dante Héctor Lagurara, was at the controls when the accident occurred. He mistakenly believed the aircraft had reached Curicó, where the flight would turn to descend into Pudahuel Airport. Lagurara failed to notice that instrument readings indicated he was still  from Curicó. As he began to descend, the aircraft struck a mountain, shearing off both wings and the tail section. The remaining portion of the fuselage slid down a glacier at an estimated  and descended about  before crashing into ice and snow. 

The flight was carrying 45 passengers and crew, including 19 members of the Old Christians Club rugby union team, along with their families, supporters, and friends. Three crew members and nine passengers died immediately; several more died soon afterward due to the frigid temperatures and the severity of their injuries. Authorities flew over the crash site several times during the following days, searching for the aircraft, but could not see the white fuselage against the snow. Search efforts were canceled after eight days.

During the following 72 days, the survivors suffered extreme hardships, including exposure, starvation, and an avalanche, which led to the deaths of thirteen more passengers. The remaining passengers resorted to cannibalism. As the weather improved with the arrival of late spring, two survivors, Nando Parrado and Roberto Canessa, climbed a  mountain peak without gear and hiked for 10 days into Chile to seek help, traveling 61 km (38 miles). On 23 December 1972, two months after the crash, the last of the 16 survivors were rescued. The news of their miraculous survival drew world-wide headlines that grew into a media circus.

Flight and accident

Flight origins 

Members of the amateur Old Christians Club rugby union team from Montevideo, Uruguay, were scheduled to play a match against the Old Boys Club, an English rugby team in Santiago, Chile. Club president Daniel Juan chartered a Uruguayan Air Force twin turboprop Fairchild FH-227D to fly the team over the Andes to Santiago. The aircraft carried 40 passengers and five crew members. Colonel Julio César Ferradas was an experienced Air Force pilot who had a total of 5,117 flying hours. He was accompanied by co-pilot Lieutenant-Colonel Dante Héctor Lagurara. There were 10 extra seats and the team members invited a few friends and family members to accompany them. When someone cancelled at the last minute, Graziela Mariani bought the seat so she could attend her oldest daughter's wedding.

The aircraft departed Carrasco International Airport on 12 October 1972, but a storm front over the Andes forced them to stop overnight in Mendoza, Argentina. Given that the FH-227 aircraft was fully loaded, this route would have required the pilot to very carefully calculate fuel consumption and to avoid the mountains. Instead, it was customary for this type of aircraft to fly a longer , 90-minute U-shaped route from Mendoza south to Malargüe using the A7 airway (known today as UW44). From there, aircraft flew west via the G-17 (UB684) airway, crossing Planchón to the Curicó radiobeacon in Chile, and from there north to Santiago.

The weather on 13 October also affected the flight. On that morning conditions over the Andes had not improved but changes were expected by the early afternoon. The pilot waited and took off at 2:18p.m. on Friday 13 October from Mendoza. He flew south from Mendoza towards Malargüe radiobeacon at flight level 180 (FL180). Planchón Pass is the air traffic control hand-off point from one side of the Andes to the other, with controllers in Mendoza transferring flight tracking duties over to Pudahuel air traffic control in Santiago, Chile. Once across the mountains in Chile, south of Curicó, the aircraft was supposed to turn north and initiate a descent into Pudahuel Airport in Santiago.

Crash 

Pilot Ferradas had flown across the Andes 29 times previously. On this flight he was training co-pilot Lagurara, who was at the controls. As they flew through the Andes, clouds obscured the mountains. The aircraft, FAU 571, was four years old and had 792 airframe hours. The aircraft was regarded by some pilots as underpowered, and had been nicknamed by them as the "lead-sled".

While some reports state the pilot incorrectly estimated his position using dead reckoning, the pilot was relying on radio navigation. The aircraft's VOR/DME instrument displayed to the pilot a digital reading of the distance to the next radio beacon in Curicó. At Planchón Pass, the aircraft still had to travel  to reach Curicó. 

Regardless, at 3:21p.m., shortly after transiting the pass, Lagurara contacted Santiago and notified air traffic controllers that he expected to reach Curicó a minute later. The flight time from the pass to Curicó is normally 11 minutes, but only three minutes later the pilot told Santiago that they were passing Curicó and turning north. He requested permission from air traffic control to descend. Later analysis of their flight path found the pilot had not only turned too early, but turned on a heading of 014 degrees, when he should have turned to 030 degrees.

As the aircraft descended, severe turbulence tossed the aircraft up and down. Nando Parrado recalled hitting a downdraft, causing the plane to drop several hundred feet and out of the clouds. The rugby players joked about the turbulence at first, until some passengers saw that the aircraft was very close to the mountain. "That was probably the moment when the pilots saw the black ridge rising dead ahead."

Roberto Canessa later said that he thought the pilot turned north too soon, and began the descent to Santiago while the aircraft was still high in the Andes. Then, "he began to climb, until the plane was nearly vertical and it began to stall and shake." The aircraft ground collision alarm sounded, alarming all of the passengers.

The pilot applied maximum power in an attempt to gain altitude. Witness accounts and evidence at the scene indicated the plane struck the mountain either two or three times. The next collision severed the right wing. Some evidence indicates it was thrown back with such force that it tore off the vertical stabilizer and the tail-cone. When the tail-cone was detached, it took with it the rear portion of the fuselage, including two rows of seats in the rear section of the passenger cabin, the galley, baggage hold, vertical stabilizer, and horizontal stabilizers, leaving a gaping hole in the rear of the fuselage. Three passengers, the navigator, and the steward were lost with the tail section.

One of the propellers sliced through the fuselage as the wing it was attached to was severed. Two more passengers fell out of the open rear of the fuselage. When the fuselage collided with a snow bank, the seats were torn from their base and thrown against the forward bulkhead and each other. The impact crushed the cockpit with the two pilots inside, killing Ferradas immediately.

The official investigation concluded that the crash was caused by controlled flight into terrain due to pilot error.

After the crash 

Of the 45 people on the aircraft, three passengers and two crew members in the tail section were killed when it broke apart: Lt. Ramón Saúl Martínez, Orvido Ramírez (plane steward), Gaston Costemalle, Alejo Hounié, and Guido Magri. A few seconds later, Daniel Shaw and Carlos Valeta fell out of the rear fuselage. Valeta survived his fall, but stumbled down the snow-covered glacier, fell into deep snow, and was asphyxiated. His body was found by fellow passengers on 14 December.

At least four died from the impact of the fuselage hitting the snow bank, which ripped the remaining seats from their anchors and hurled them to the front of the plane: team physician Dr. Francisco Nicola and his wife Esther Nicola; Eugenia Parrado and Fernando Vazquez (medical student). Pilot Ferradas died instantly when the nose gear compressed the instrument panel against his chest, forcing his head out of the window; co-pilot Lagurara was critically injured and trapped in the crushed cockpit. He asked one of the passengers to find his pistol and shoot him, but the passenger declined.

Thirty-three remained alive, although many were seriously or critically injured, with wounds including broken legs which had resulted from the aircraft's seats collapsing forward against the luggage partition and the pilot's cabin.

Canessa and Gustavo Zerbino, both medical students, acted quickly to assess the severity of people's wounds and treat those they could help most. Nando Parrado had a skull fracture and remained in a coma for three days. Enrique Platero had a piece of metal stuck in his abdomen that when removed brought a few inches of intestine with it, but he immediately began helping others. Both of Arturo Nogueira's legs were broken in several places. None of the passengers with compound fractures survived.

Search and rescue

The Chilean Air Search and Rescue Service (SARS) was notified within the hour that the flight was missing. Four planes searched that afternoon until dark. The news of the missing flight reached Uruguayan media about 6:00p.m. that evening. Officers of the Chilean SARS listened to the radio transmissions and concluded the aircraft had come down in one of the most remote and inaccessible areas of the Andes. They called on the Andes Rescue Group of Chile (CSA).

On the second day, 11 aircraft from Argentina, Chile and Uruguay searched for the downed flight. The search area included their location and a few aircraft flew near the crash site. The survivors tried to use lipstick recovered from the luggage to write an SOS on the roof of the aircraft, but they quit after realizing that they lacked enough lipstick to make letters visible from the air. They also built a cross in the snow using luggage, but it was unseen by the search and rescue aircraft. They saw three aircraft fly overhead, but were unable to attract their attention, and none of the aircraft crews spotted the white fuselage against the snow. The harsh conditions gave searchers little hope that they would find anyone alive. Search efforts were cancelled after eight days. On 21 October, after searching a total of 142 hours and 30 minutes, the searchers concluded that there was no hope and terminated the search. The snow had not melted at this time in the southern hemisphere spring; they hoped to find the bodies in December, when the snow melted in the summer.

First week 

During the first night, five more people died: co-pilot Lagurara, Francisco Abal, Graziela Mariani, Felipe Maquirriain, and Julio Martinez-Lamas.

The passengers removed the broken seats and other debris from the aircraft and fashioned a crude shelter. To try to keep out some of the cold, they used luggage, seats, and snow to close off the open end of the fuselage. They improvised in other ways. Fito Strauch devised a way to obtain water in freezing conditions by using sheet metal from under the seats and placing snow on it. The solar collector melted snow which dripped into empty wine bottles. To prevent snow blindness, he improvised sunglasses using the sun visors in the pilot's cabin, wire, and a bra strap. They removed the seat covers, which were partially made of wool, to use against the cold. They used the seat cushions as snow shoes. Marcelo Perez, captain of the rugby team, assumed leadership.

Nando Parrado woke from his coma after three days to learn that his mother had died and that his 19-year-old sister Susana Parrado was severely injured. He attempted to keep her alive without success, as during the eighth day she succumbed to her injuries. All had lived near the sea; some of the team members had never seen snow before, and none had experience at high altitude. The survivors lacked medical supplies, cold-weather clothing and equipment or food, and only had three pairs of sunglasses among them to help prevent snow blindness.

The survivors found a small transistor radio jammed between seats on the aircraft, and Roy Harley improvised a very long antenna using electrical cable from the plane. He heard the news that the search was cancelled on their 11th day on the mountain. Piers Paul Read's book Alive: The Story of the Andes Survivors described the moments after this discovery:

Cannibalism
The survivors had very little food: eight chocolate bars, a tin of mussels, three small jars of jam, a tin of almonds, a few dates, candies, dried plums, and several bottles of wine. During the days following the crash, they divided this into small amounts to make their meager supply last as long as possible. Parrado ate a single chocolate-covered peanut over three days.

Even with this strict rationing, their food stock dwindled quickly. There was no natural vegetation and there were no animals on either the glacier or nearby snow-covered mountain. The food ran out after a week, and the group tried to eat parts of the airplane, such as the cotton inside the seats and leather. They became sicker from eating these.

Knowing that rescue efforts had been called off and faced with starvation and death, those still alive agreed that, should they die, the others might consume their bodies to live. With no choice, the survivors ate the bodies of their dead friends. 

Survivor Roberto Canessa described the decision to eat the pilots and their dead friends and family members:

The group survived by collectively deciding to eat flesh from the bodies of their dead comrades. This decision was not taken lightly, as most of the dead were classmates, close friends, or relatives. Canessa used broken glass from the aircraft windshield as a cutting tool. He set the example by swallowing the first matchstick-sized strip of frozen flesh. Later on, several others did the same. The next day, more survivors ate the meat offered to them, but a few refused or could not keep it down.

In his memoir, Miracle in the Andes: 72 Days on the Mountain and My Long Trek Home (2006), Nando Parrado wrote about this decision:

Parrado protected the corpses of his sister and mother, and they were never eaten. They dried the meat in the sun, which made it more palatable. They were initially so revolted by the experience that they could eat only skin, muscle and fat. When the supply of flesh was diminished, they also ate hearts, lungs and even brains.

All of the passengers were Roman Catholic. Some feared eternal damnation. According to Read, some rationalized the act of cannibalism as equivalent to the Eucharist, the Body and Blood of Jesus Christ under the appearances of bread and wine. Others justified it according to a Bible verse found in John 15:13: 'No man hath greater love than this: that he lay down his life for his friends.'

In the end, all of those who had survived as of the decision to eat the bodies did so, though not all without reservations. Javier Methol and his wife Liliana, the only surviving female passenger, were the last survivors to eat human flesh. She had strong religious convictions, and only reluctantly agreed to partake of the flesh after she was told to view it as "like Holy Communion".

Avalanche
Seventeen days after the crash, near midnight on 29 October, an avalanche struck the aircraft containing the survivors as they slept. It filled the fuselage and killed eight people: Enrique Platero, Liliana Methol, Gustavo Nicolich, Daniel Maspons, Juan Menendez, Diego Storm, Carlos Roque, and Marcelo Perez. The death of Perez, the team captain and leader of the survivors, along with the loss of Liliana Methol, who had nursed the survivors "like a mother and a saint", were extremely discouraging to those remaining alive.

The avalanche completely buried the fuselage and filled the interior to within  of the roof. The survivors trapped inside soon realized they were running out of air. Nando Parrado found a metal pole from the luggage racks and they were able to get one of the windows from the pilot's cabin open enough to poke a hole through the snow, providing ventilation. With considerable difficulty, on the morning of 31 October, they dug a tunnel from the cockpit to the surface, only to encounter a furious blizzard that left them no choice but to stay inside the fuselage.

For three days, the remaining survivors were trapped in the extremely cramped space within the buried fuselage with about  headroom, together with the corpses of those who had died in the avalanche. With no other choice, on the third day they began to eat the raw flesh of their newly dead friends. Parrado later said, "It was soft and greasy, streaked with blood and bits of wet gristle. I gagged hard when I placed it in my mouth."

With Perez dead, cousins Eduardo and Fito Strauch and Daniel Fernández assumed leadership. They took over harvesting flesh from their deceased friends and distributing it to the others.

Before the avalanche, a few of the survivors became insistent that their only way of survival would be to climb over the mountains and search for help. Because of the co-pilot's dying statement that the aircraft had passed Curicó, the group believed the Chilean countryside was just a few kilometres away to the west. The snow that had buried the fuselage gradually melted as summer arrived. Survivors made several brief expeditions in the immediate vicinity of the aircraft in the first few weeks after the crash, but they found that altitude sickness, dehydration, snow blindness, malnourishment, and the extreme cold during the nights made traveling any significant distance an impossible task.

Expedition explores area 

The passengers decided that a few members would seek help. Several survivors were determined to join the expedition team, including Roberto Canessa, one of the two medical students, but others were less willing or unsure of their ability to withstand such a physically exhausting ordeal. Numa Turcatti and Antonio Vizintin were chosen to accompany Canessa and Parrado; however, Turcatti's leg was stepped on and the bruise had become septic, so he was unable to join the expedition. Canessa, Parrado, and Vizintín were among the strongest boys and were allocated larger rations of food and the warmest clothes. They were also spared the daily manual labor around the crash site that was essential for the group's survival, so they could build their strength. At Canessa's urging, they waited nearly seven days to allow for higher temperatures. 

They hoped to get to Chile to the west, but a large mountain lay west of the crash site, persuading them to try heading east first. They hoped that the valley they were in would make a U-turn and allow them to start walking west to Chile. Inside and nearby, they found luggage containing a box of chocolates, three meat patties, a bottle of rum, cigarettes, extra clothes, comic books, and a little medicine. They also found the aircraft's two-way radio. The group decided to camp that night inside the tail section. They built a fire and stayed up late reading comic books.

They continued east the next morning. On the second night of the expedition, which was their first night sleeping outside, they nearly froze to death. After some debate the next morning, they decided that it would be wiser to return to the tail, remove the aircraft's batteries, and take them back to the fuselage so they might power up the radio and make an SOS call to Santiago for help.

Radio inoperative 

Upon returning to the tail, the trio found that the  batteries were too heavy to take back to the fuselage, which lay uphill from the tail section. They decided instead that it would be more effective to return to the fuselage and disconnect the radio system from the aircraft's frame, take it back to the tail, and connect it to the batteries. One of the team members, Roy Harley, was an amateur electronics enthusiast, and they recruited his help in the endeavour. Unknown to any of the team members, the aircraft's electrical system used 115 volts AC, while the battery they had located produced 24 volts DC, making the plan futile from the beginning.

After several days of trying to make the radio work, they gave up and returned to the fuselage with the knowledge that they would have to climb out of the mountains if they were to have any hope of being rescued. On the return trip, they were struck by a blizzard. Harley lay down to die, but Parrado would not let him stop and took him back to the fuselage.

Three more deaths 

On 15 November, Arturo Nogueira died, and three days later, Rafael Echavarren died, both from gangrene due to their infected wounds.  Numa Turcatti, whose extreme revulsion for eating the meat dramatically accelerated his physical decline, died on day 60 (11 December) weighing only 25 kg (55 pounds). Those left knew that they would die if they did not find help. The survivors heard on the transistor radio that the Uruguayan Air Force had resumed searching for them.

Rescue trek

Making a sleeping bag 

It was now apparent that the only way out was to climb over the mountains to the west. They also realized that unless they found a way to survive the freezing temperature of the nights, a trek was impossible. The survivors who had found the rear of the fuselage came up with an idea to use insulation from the rear of the fuselage, copper wire, and waterproof fabric that covered the air conditioning of the plane to fashion a sleeping bag.

Nando Parrado described in his book, Miracle in the Andes: 72 Days on the Mountain and My Long Trek Home, how they came up with the idea of making a sleeping bag: 

After the sleeping bag was completed and Numa Turcatti died, Canessa was still hesitant. While others encouraged Parrado, none would volunteer to go with him. Parrado finally persuaded Canessa to set out, and joined by Vizintín, the three men took to the mountain on 12 December.

Climbing the peak 

They trekked for over ten days, traveling  61 km (38 miles). seeking help. Given the pilot's dying statement that they were near Curicó, they believed that they were near the western edge of the Andes, and that the closest help lay in that direction. As a result, they brought only a three-day supply of meat.

Parrado wore three pairs of jeans and three sweaters over a polo shirt. He wore four pairs of socks wrapped in a plastic shopping bag. They had no technical gear, no map or compass, and no climbing experience. Instead of climbing the ridge to the west which was somewhat lower than the peak, they climbed straight up the steep mountain. They thought they would reach the peak in one day. Parrado took the lead and the other two often had to remind him to slow down, although the thin oxygen-poor air made it difficult for all of them. During part of the climb, they sank up to their hips in the snow, which had been softened by the summer sun.

It was still bitterly cold, but the sleeping bag allowed them to live through the nights. In the documentary film Stranded, Canessa described how on the first night during the ascent, they had difficulty finding a place to put down the sleeping bag. A storm blew fiercely, and they finally found a spot on a ledge of rock on the edge of an abyss. Canessa said it was the worst night of his life. The climb was very slow; the survivors at the fuselage watched them climb for three days. On the second day, Canessa thought he saw a road to the east, and tried to persuade Parrado to head in that direction. Parrado disagreed and they argued without reaching a decision.

On the third morning of the trek, Canessa stayed at their camp. Vizintín and Parrado reached the base of a near-vertical wall more than one hundred meters (300 feet) tall encased in snow and ice. Parrado was determined to hike out or die trying. He used a stick from his pack to carve steps in the wall. Thinking he would see the green valleys of Chile to the west, he was stunned to see a vast array of mountain peaks in every direction. They had climbed a mountain on the border of Argentina and Chile, meaning the trekkers were still tens of kilometres from the green valleys of Chile. Vizintín and Parrado rejoined Canessa where they had slept the night before. At sunset, while sipping cognac that they had found in the tail section, Parrado said, "Roberto, can you imagine how beautiful this would be if we were not dead men?" The next morning, the three men could see that the hike was going to take much longer than they had originally planned. They were running out of food, so Vizintín agreed to return to the crash site leaving his remaining portions to the other two. The return was entirely downhill, and using an aircraft seat as a makeshift sleigh, he returned to the crash site in one hour.

Parrado and Canessa took three hours to climb to the summit. When Canessa reached the top and saw nothing but snow-capped mountains for kilometres around them, his first thought was, "We're dead." Parrado saw two smaller peaks on the western horizon that were not covered in snow. A valley at the base of the mountain they stood on wound its way towards the peaks. Parrado was sure this was their way out of the mountains. He refused to give up hope. Canessa agreed to go west. Only much later did Canessa learn that the road he saw to the east would have gotten them to rescue sooner and easier.

On the summit, Parrado told Canessa, "We may be walking to our deaths, but I would rather walk to meet my death than wait for it to come to me." Canessa agreed. "You and I are friends, Nando. We have been through so much. Now let's go die together." They followed the ridge towards the valley and descended a considerable distance.

Finding help 
 
Parrado and Canessa hiked for several more days. First, they were able to reach the narrow valley that Parrado had seen on the top of the mountain, where they found the source of Río San José, leading to Río Portillo which meets Río Azufre at Maitenes. They followed the river and reached the snowline.

Gradually, there appeared more and more signs of human presence; first some evidence of camping, and finally on the ninth day, some cows. When they rested that evening they were very tired, and Canessa seemed unable to proceed further.

As the men gathered wood to build a fire, one of them saw three men on horseback at the other side of the river. Parrado called them, but the noise of the river made it impossible to communicate. One of the men across the river saw Parrado and Canessa and shouted back, "Tomorrow!" The next day, the man returned. He scribbled a note, attached it and a pencil to a rock with some string, and threw the message across the river. Parrado replied:

Sergio Catalán, a Chilean arriero (muleteer), read the note and gave them a sign that he understood. Catalán talked with the other two men, and one of them remembered that several weeks before Carlos Páez's father had asked them if they had heard about the Andes plane crash. The arrieros could not imagine that anyone could still be alive. Catalán threw bread to the men across the river. He then rode on horseback westward for 10 hours to bring help.

During the trip he saw another arriero on the south side of Río Azufre, and asked him to reach the men and to bring them to Los Maitenes. Then, he followed the river to its junction with Río Tinguiririca, where after crossing a bridge, he was able to reach the narrow route that linked the village of Puente Negro to the holiday resort of Termas del Flaco. Here, he was able to stop a truck and reach the police station at Puente Negro.

They relayed news of the survivors to the Army command in San Fernando, Chile, who contacted the Army in Santiago. Meanwhile, Parrado and Canessa were brought on horseback to Los Maitenes de Curicó, where they were fed and allowed to rest.

Helicopter rescue

When the news broke out that people had survived the crash of Uruguayan Air Force Flight 571, the story of the passengers' survival after 72 days drew international attention. A flood of international reporters began walking several kilometers along the route from Puente Negro to Termas del Flaco. The reporters clamored to interview Parrado and Canessa about the crash and their survival ordeal.

The Chilean Air Force provided three Bell UH-1 helicopters to assist with the rescue. They flew in heavy cloud cover under instrument conditions to Los Maitenes de Curicó where the army interviewed Parrado and Canessa. When the fog lifted at about noon, Parrado volunteered to lead the helicopters to the crash site. He had brought the pilot's flight chart and guided the helicopters up the mountain to the location of the remaining survivors. One helicopter remained behind in reserve. The pilots were astounded at the difficult terrain the two men had crossed to reach help.

On the afternoon of 22 December 1972, the two helicopters carrying search and rescue personnel reached the survivors. The steep terrain only permitted the pilot to touch down with a single skid. Due to the altitude and weight limits, the two helicopters were able to take only half of the survivors. Four members of the search and rescue team volunteered to stay with the seven survivors remaining on the mountain.

The survivors slept a final night in the fuselage with the search and rescue party. The second flight of helicopters arrived the following morning at daybreak. They carried the remaining survivors to hospitals in Santiago for evaluation. They were treated for a variety of conditions, including altitude sickness, dehydration, frostbite, broken bones, scurvy, and malnutrition.

The last remaining survivors were rescued on 23 December 1972, more than two months after the crash.

Under normal circumstances, the search and rescue team would have brought back the remains of the dead for burial. However, given the circumstances, including that the bodies were in Argentina, the Chilean rescuers left the bodies at the site until authorities could make the necessary decisions. The Chilean military photographed the bodies and mapped the area.

Aftermath

Cannibalism revealed 
Upon being rescued, the survivors initially explained that they had eaten some cheese and other food they had carried with them, and then local plants and herbs. They planned to discuss the details of how they survived, including their cannibalism, in private with their families. Rumors circulated in Montevideo immediately after the rescue that the survivors had killed some of the others for food. On 23 December, news reports of cannibalism were published worldwide, except in Uruguay. On 26 December, two pictures taken by members of Cuerpo de Socorro Andino (Andean Relief Corps) of a half-eaten human leg were printed on the front page of two Chilean newspapers, El Mercurio  and La Tercera de la Hora, who reported that all survivors resorted to cannibalism. 

The survivors held a press conference on 28 December at Stella Maris College in Montevideo, where they recounted the events of the past 72 days. Alfredo Delgado spoke for the survivors. He compared their actions to that of Jesus Christ at the Last Supper, during which he gave his disciples the Eucharist. The survivors received public backlash initially, but after they explained the pact the survivors had made to sacrifice their flesh if they died to help the others survive, the outcry diminished and the families were more understanding. A Catholic priest heard the survivors' confessions and told them that they were not damned for cannibalism (eating human flesh), given the in extremis nature of their survival situation. The news of their survival and the actions required to live drew world-wide attention and grew into a media circus.

Remains buried at site 

The authorities and the victims' families decided to bury the remains near the site of the crash in a common grave. 13 bodies were untouched, while another 15 were mostly skeletal. Twelve men and a Chilean priest were transported to the crash site on 18 January 1973. Family members were not allowed to attend. Close to the grave, they built a simple stone altar and staked an orange iron cross on it. They placed a plaque on the pile of rocks inscribed:

They doused the remains of the fuselage in gasoline and set it alight. Eduardo Strauch later mentioned in his book Out of the Silence that the bottom half of the fuselage, which was covered in snow and untouched by the fire, was still there during his first visit in 1995. The father of one victim had received word from a survivor that his son wished to be buried at home. Unable to obtain official permission to retrieve his son's body, Ricardo Echavarren mounted an expedition on his own with hired guides. He had prearranged with the priest who had buried his son to mark the bag containing his son's remains. Upon his return to the abandoned Hotel Termas with his son's remains, he was arrested for grave robbing. A federal judge and the local mayor intervened to obtain his release, and Echavarren later obtained legal permission to bury his son.

Timeline

Survivors

 Roberto Canessa* (medical student)
 Nando Parrado*
 Carlos Páez Rodríguez*
 José Pedro Algorta (economics student)
 Alfredo "Pancho" Delgado
 Daniel Fernández
 Roberto "Bobby" François
 Roy Harley*
 José "Coche" Luis Inciarte
 Álvaro Mangino
 Javier Methol†
 Ramón Sabella
 Adolfo "Fito" Strauch
 Eduardo Strauch
 Antonio "Tintin" Vizintín*
 Gustavo Zerbino* (medical student)

* Rugby players

† Survivor who has since died

Legacy 

The survivors' courage under extremely adverse conditions has been described as "a beacon of hope to [their] generation, showing what can be accomplished with persistence and determination in the presence of unsurpassable odds, and set our minds to attain a common aim".

The story of the crash is described in the Andes Museum 1972, dedicated in 2013 in Ciudad Vieja, Montevideo.

In 1973, mothers of 11 young people who died in the plane crash founded the Our Children Library in Uruguay to promote reading and teaching. Family members of victims of the flight founded Fundación Viven in 2006 to preserve the legacy of the flight, memory of the victims, and support organ donation.

The crash location attracts hundreds of people from all over the world who pay tribute to the victims and survivors and learn about how they survived. The trip to the location takes three days. Four-wheel drive vehicles transport travelers from the village of El Sosneado to Puesto Araya, near the abandoned Hotel Termas del Sosneado. From there, travelers ride on horseback, though some choose to walk. They stop overnight on the mountain at El Barroso camp. On the third day, they reach Las Lágrimas glacier, where the remains of the accident are found.

In March 2006, the families of those aboard the flight had a black obelisk monument built at the crash site memorializing those who lived and died.

In 2007, Chilean arriero Sergio Catalán was interviewed on Chilean television during which he revealed that he had leg (hip) arthrosis. Canessa, who had become a doctor, and other survivors raised funds to pay for a hip replacement operation. Sergio Catalán died on 11 February 2020 at the age of 91.

In popular culture 

Over the years, survivors have published books, been portrayed in films and television productions, and produced an official website about the event.

Books

 Read's book, based on interview of the survivors and their families, was a critical success and remains a highly popular work of non-fiction. Harper published a reprint in 2005, re-titled: Alive: Sixteen Men, Seventy-two Days, and Insurmountable Odds – The Classic Adventure of Survival in the Andes. It includes a revised introduction as well as interviews with Piers Paul Read, Coche Inciarte, and Álvaro Mangino.
Stephen King (1977). The Shining. King references the crash in his book notoriously set at an isolated hotel in the Rocky Mountains during its harsh winter months. Wendy develops a fear of the hotel's elevator, specifically being trapped inside with no one else around to save them, and Jack Torrance speculates that "she could see them growing thinner and weaker, starving to death. Or perhaps dining on each other the way those rugby players had."

 In this book, Canessa recalls how the plane crash helped him learn many life lessons about survival, and how his time in the mountains helped renew his motivation to become a doctor.
 Four decades after the tragedy, a climber discovered survivor Eduardo Strauch's wallet near the memorialized crash site and returned it to him, a gesture that compelled Strauch to finally "break the silence of the mountains".
 A comprehensive history of the Andes tragedy, appearing fifty years after the event. Retells the story both on and off the mountain, giving an in-depth look at the world from which the passengers came, and an analysis of the possible causes of the accident. The book includes detailed accounts of those who died.

Film and television
 Survive! (1976), also known as Supervivientes de los Andes, is a Mexican feature film production directed by René Cardona, Jr. and based on Blair's book, Survive! (1973)
The incident is mentioned in the 1978 survival film Cyclone.
Alive (1993) is a feature film directed by Frank Marshall, narrated by John Malkovich, and starring Ethan Hawke, based on Read's book Alive: The Story of the Andes Survivors. Nando Parrado served as a technical adviser to the film. Eleven of the survivors visited the set during the production.
Alive: 20 Years Later (1993) is a documentary film produced, directed, and written by Jill Fullerton-Smith and narrated by Martin Sheen. It explores the lives of the survivors 20 years after the crash and discusses their participation in the production of Alive: The Miracle of the Andes.
Stranded: I Have Come from a Plane That Crashed on the Mountains (2007), written and directed by Gonzalo Arijón, is a documentary film interlaced with dramatised scenes. All the survivors are interviewed, along with some of their family members and people involved with the rescue operation, and an expedition in which the survivors return to the crash site is documented. The film premiered at the 2007 International Documentary Film Festival Amsterdam, Netherlands and received the Joris Ivens Award. This film appeared on PBS Independent Lens as "Stranded: The Andes Plane Crash Survivors" in May 2009.
"Trapped: Alive in the Andes" (7 November 2007) is a season 1 episode of the National Geographic Channel documentary television series Trapped. The series examines incidents which left survivors trapped in their situation for a period of time.
I Am Alive: Surviving the Andes Plane Crash (20 October 2010) is a documentary film directed by Brad Osborne that first aired on the History Channel. The film mixed reenactments with interviews with the survivors and members of the original search teams. Also interviewed were Piers Paul Read, renowned mountain climber Ed Viesturs, Andes Survivors expert and alpinist Ricardo Peña, historians, expert pilots, and high-altitude medical experts.
The incident is mentioned in a 2011 horror film The Divide.
The Rick and Morty episode "The Vat of Acid Episode" parodies the events of the crash and the subsequent survival efforts. The number 571 can be seen on the side of the plane.
In the Rocko's Modern Life episode "Tickled Pinky", Rocko is listing several dangerous activities he and Pinky have engaged in. The last item on the list is "flying over The Andes with a Brazilian soccer team". 
The 2021 Bengali web series Robindronath Ekhane Kawkhono Khete Aashenni loosely portrays the incident.
The incident was the basis for the Showtime series Yellowjackets.
The incident is mentioned in the HBO limited series Station Eleven. Episode 7, "Goodbye My Damaged Home".
Society of the Snow is an upcoming feature film about the incident directed by J. A. Bayona.

Stage 
 The play Sobrevivir a Los Andes (Surviving the Andes) was written by Gabriel Guerrero and premiered on 13 October 2017. Based on the account written by Nando Parrado, it was presented in 2017 at Teatro la Candela in Montevideo, Uruguay and in 2018 at Teatro Regina in Buenos Aires, Argentina.
Miracle Flight 571, composed and created by Lloyd Burritt, is a two-act chamber opera based on the book Miracle in the Andes by Nando Parrado. It received its musical premiere at the 2016 What Next Festival of Music.

Music
Thomas Dolby's debut LP, The Golden Age of Wireless, contained the instrumental "The Wreck of the Fairchild" (loosely based on the 1972 Uruguayan plane crash) in its first UK edition; this was excised from the first US release but restored on the 2009 remastered collector's edition CD.
Miracle in the Andes, composed and created by musician Adam Young, is a musical score comprising 10 tracks that tell the story of the Andes flight disaster through song.
Punk band GBH included a graphic experience of the passengers on the Uruguayan Air Force Flight 571 in their song "Passenger on the Menu" (1982).
"The Plot Sickens", by the American metalcore band Ice Nine Kills, appears on their 2015 album Every Trick in the Book.
The song "Snowcapped Andes Crash" appears on Melody's Echo Chamber's self-titled 2012 album.

See also
1947 BSAA Avro Lancastrian Star Dust accident, crashed into Mount Tupungato on 2 August 1947.
LAN Chile Flight 621, crashed in the Andes on 3 April 1961.
LANSA Flight 508
Emergency position-indicating radiobeacon station
List of accidents involving sports teams
List of incidents of cannibalism
Donner Party

References

Further reading

Books

Articles

External links

 
 
  Museum Andes / Andes Crash Memorial
 
 
 
 
 
 WiCis Sports-Benegas Brothers 2017 Expedition with live streaming of biometrics and geo-location

 
1972 in Argentina
1972 in Chile
1972 in Uruguay
Accidents and incidents involving the Fairchild F-27
Airliner accidents and incidents involving controlled flight into terrain
Aviation accidents and incidents involving professional sports teams
Argentina–Uruguay relations
Chile–Uruguay relations
Incidents of cannibalism
October 1972 events in South America
Aviation accidents and incidents in 1972
1972 disasters in Argentina